Mustla is a small borough in Viljandi Parish, Viljandi County, Estonia. As of 2011 Census, the settlement's population was 818.

1938–1979 Mustla was a town with town privileges.

In June 2018, a plaque commemorating Alfons Rebane was unveiled on the wall of a private building in Mustla where he had lived. The Russian Ministry of Foreign Affairs protested the unveiling.

References

Boroughs and small boroughs in Estonia
Kreis Fellin